Allotinus punctatus is a butterfly in the family Lycaenidae. It was described by Georg Semper in 1889. It is found on Mindanao in the Philippines.

References

Butterflies described in 1889
Allotinus
Butterflies of Asia